Shmuel Gal (born 1940) is a mathematician and professor of statistics at the University of Haifa in Israel.

He devised the Gal's accurate tables method for the computer evaluation of elementary functions.  With Zvi Yehudai he developed in 1993 a new algorithm for sorting which is used by IBM.

Gal has solved the Princess and monster game and made several significant contributions to the area of search games.

He has been working on rendezvous problems with his collaborative colleagues Steve Alpern, Vic Baston, and John Howard.

Gal received a Ph.D. in mathematics from the Hebrew University of Jerusalem. His thesis advisor was Aryeh Dvoretzky.

References

External links
Prof. Shmuel Gal - Home page

Game theorists
Hebrew University of Jerusalem alumni
Israeli mathematicians
Israeli operations researchers
Academic staff of the University of Haifa
Jewish systems scientists

Living people
1940 births